Joe Simon (September 7, 1936 – December 13, 2021) was an American soul and R&B musician. He began as a gospel artist singing with the Golden West Singers in the Bay Area in California. A consistent presence on the US charts between 1964 and 1981, Simon charted 51 U.S. Pop and R&B chart hits between 1964 and 1981, including eight times in the US top forty, thirty-eight times in the top 40 of the US R&B charts, and 13 chart hits in Canada. His biggest hits included three number one entries on the US Billboard R&B chart: "The Chokin' Kind" (1969), "Power of Love" (1972), and "Get Down, Get Down (Get on the Floor)" (1975). In 2021, he was one of the 60 nominees for the National Rhythm & Blues Hall of Fame.

Career
Simon was born in Simmesport, Louisiana, United States. Similar to many other African-American artists from the era, Simon began singing in his father's Baptist church. He pursued his vocal abilities full-time once the family moved to Richmond (near Oakland, California) in the late 1950s. There Simon joined the Golden West Gospel Singers and became influenced by Sam Cooke and Arthur Prysock. With this, the group decided to turn secular and recorded "Little Island Girl" as the Golden Tones in 1959.

Hush Records label owners Gary and Carla Thompson urged Simon to record on his own, and in 1964 Simon scored a minor hit on the Vee-Jay label with "My Adorable One". Simon scored again in 1965 on the Chicago-based label with "Let's Do It Over", which landed a #13 spot on the US Billboard R&B chart. However, the Vee-Jay label folded soon after the latter song's release and Simon found himself travelling across the country singing.

Simon caught the eye of Nashville, Tennessee, R&B disc jockey John Richbourg during this time, and Richbourg not only became Simon's manager/record producer but also brought the singer to Monument Records' subsidiary label Sound Stage 7 in 1966. That year Simon released "Teenager's Prayer", which peaked at #11 on Billboard's R&B chart. Within the next two years, Simon released a string of hits: "(You Keep Me) Hanging On", "The Chokin' Kind" (Billboard Hot 100 #13), "Farther on Down The Road", and "Yours Love". "The Chokin' Kind" was written by Harlan Howard, spent 12 weeks in the charts, and had sold one million copies by June 16, 1969. In addition, Simon was given a Grammy Award in 1970 for Best Male R&B Vocal Performance.

In 1969, his composition "My Special Prayer", which had been a minor US hit for himself and for Percy Sledge, went to number one on the Dutch Top 40 in Sledge's version, spending 32 weeks on chart in two separate chart runs.

Under the encouragement of Richbourg, Simon moved to the Polydor distributed Spring Records label in 1970, which paired Simon with Kenny Gamble and Leon Huff. The team scored a #3 R&B hit in 1971 with "Drowning in the Sea of Love" and a #1 R&B hit in the summer of 1972 with "Power of Love". Both songs reached #11 on the Hot 100. "Drowning in the Sea of Love" sold over 1.5 million copies and the RIAA on January 6, 1972, gave a gold disc. "Power of Love", written by Gamble, Huff and Simon was Simon's third million seller, and the R.I.A.A. awarded gold disc status on August 29, 1972.

Simon continued to release R&B hits with "Pool of Bad Luck", "Trouble in My Home", "Step By Step" (his only UK success), "I Need You, You Need Me", "Music in My Bones", "Carry Me", and 1975's "Get Down, Get Down (Get on the Floor)", which gave Simon his third #1 R&B hit, and also a #8 Hot 100 hit. Simon's success escalated with his writing/producing the theme tune for the film Cleopatra Jones in 1973.

In the late 1970s/early 1980s, Simon decided to remove his tenor/bass-baritone voice from the secular music world and devote it and other parts of his life to Christianity. Simon began evangelical preaching in Flossmoor, Illinois. In 1983, he produced the album Lay My Burden Down for former Davis Sisters second lead Jackie Verdell.  Simon briefly returned to secular music in 1985 for his Mr. Right album, though none of its singles charted. He went on to release a gospel album titled This Story Must Be Told in the late 1990s.

In 1999, Simon was inducted as a Pioneer Award honoree by the Rhythm and Blues Foundation. Joss Stone covered "The Chokin' Kind" on her 2003 album The Soul Sessions.

Simon had a number of his songs sampled by other artists, including OutKast, who sampled "Before the Night is Over" in their hit "So Fresh, So Clean" and Lil' Kim, who sampled Simon's "It Be's That Way Sometimes" in "Magic Stick", featuring 50 Cent. Memphis Bleek sampled Simon's "Trace Your Love" for the track "Alright" on his 2005 534 album.

He died on December 13, 2021. Sources gave his age as 85, in contrast to sources during his lifetime that had indicated a later year of birth.

Discography

Studio albums

Compilation albums

Singles

 From November 30, 1963, to January 23, 1965, Billboard Magazine did not publish a Hot R&B songs chart. The peak positions for R&B singles listed during this period are from Cash Box Magazine R&B songs chart.

See also
List of artists who reached number one on the Billboard R&B chart
List of soul musicians
Southern soul
Country soul
List of disco artists (F-K)

References

External links

 
 
The Joe Simon Story (YouTube Video)
An interview with Soul Express

1936 births
2021 deaths
Musicians from Richmond, California
Grammy Award winners
American rhythm and blues singers
Songwriters from Louisiana
Singers from Louisiana
Vee-Jay Records artists
Monument Records artists
Songwriters from California
People from Avoyelles Parish, Louisiana
African-American male songwriters
20th-century African-American male singers